Caffeine is an episodic First-person adventure video game created by Dylan Browne and developed by Incandescent Imaging. The creator posted the game on Indiegogo to help crowdfund the development. The game takes place on a derelict spaceship used to mine caffeine, and it is inspired by Condemned: Criminal Origins, F.E.A.R., and Doom 3. Caffeine was released in five episodes for Microsoft Windows, OS X, Linux on 5 October 2015, although it has yet to release any episodes after the first.

Caffeine was negatively received by the majority of the public and almost all of the critics. While it has not been canceled, the second episode has been on a four-year hiatus and there is not information on when it will be released.

Story and gameplay 

Caffeine is set in a universe where the Earth has run out of its caffeine supplies, so big companies invest in mining ships that go into space to mine caffeine. In Caffeine, the player takes the role of a young boy aboard a caffeine mining ship that has an extreme addiction to caffeine. The boy wakes up with no memory of why he is on the ship and decides to explore the ship. The boy runs into multiple characters throughout his journey on the mostly abandoned ship. There are no combat mechanics and the gameplay mostly involves wondering around the empty halls. The horror aspect of the game comes from what the player cannot see and the eerie sound design that makes the atmosphere frightening.

The main draw of the game is the player finding their way through the ship by solving various puzzles to let them progress the game. The puzzles are environmental and memory-based in which the player has to travel to many different locations and memorize different information in order to get through blocked areas.

There is also a lot of lore to find throughout the game in the form of sticky notes, audio logs, whiteboards, etc. The intent of this aspect is to make the game feel more lived-in.

Development and marketing 
Caffeine was developed by Incandescent Imaging, a small indie video game developer company. Their only two releases are the first episode of Caffeine and a mobile game called Boxed In. The game was developed mostly by the head of the company, Dylan Browne. He is the creative mind behind most of the game. Other important figures are composer Adam Klingman and sound designer Jonathan Wachoru, who were responsible for all of the sound and music in the game. Over the years preceding its release, Caffeine made appearances in popular video game news sites, such as IGN and Kotaku. All of this led to there being some hype surrounding the game, but it died out with a lackluster launch of episode one and no follow-up for further episodes.

Release and reception 

Caffeine was released on October 5, 2015 on Steam for PC players as well as being playable on many virtual reality systems. The game was never released to any other system. It can be bought on a per episode basis or one could buy the season pass and receive all of the episodes whenever they come out. As of now, there is no information on when the next episode for the game will be released.

Caffeine was mostly negatively received upon release and did not grow enough to hit a mainstream audience or even garner an audience of its own.

References

External links 
 

2015 video games
Crowdfunded video games
2010s horror video games
Indiegogo projects
Linux games
MacOS games
Unreal Engine games
Windows games
Indie video games
Single-player video games